Türkmentokat is a village in the Odunpazarı district of the Eskişehir province in Turkey.

Village 
There is no information about the history of the neighborhood and where its name came from.
The Battle of Dumlupınar was fought in this area.
It is 20 km from Eskişehir city center and had a population of 339 people in 2014.

Populated places in Eskişehir Province
Villages in Eskişehir Province
Odunpazarı